Mac Aodh Ua Dubhda (died 1128) was King of Ui Fiachrach Muaidhe.

Annalistic reference

 1128. The battle of Ath-Fhirdhiadh was gained by the cavalry of Conchobhar, the son of Mac Lochlainn, over the cavalry of Tighearnan Ua Ruairc, where Ua Ciardha, lord of Cairbre; Cathal Ua Raghailligh; Sitriuc Ua Maelbrighde; the son of Aedh Ua Dubhda, lord of Ui-Amhalghadha; and many others along with them, were slain, in revenge of the violation Patrick's protection.

External links

 http://www.ucc.ie/celt/published/T100005B/

References

 The History of Mayo, Hubert T. Knox, p. 379, 1908.

 

People from County Sligo
Monarchs from County Mayo
12th-century Irish monarchs
Year of birth missing
1128 deaths